Jerome Ranft is an American character sculptor and voice actor for Pixar Animation Studios. He is the younger brother of the late Pixar story artist Joe Ranft.

Career
Ranft attended Fullerton College and the California College of the Arts. He graduated in 1991.  His first job out of school was on the Tim Burton-produced classic The Nightmare Before Christmas. Ranft joined Pixar in 1997 working as a character sculptor on Geri's Game (1997) and later on Pixar's second film A Bug's Life (1998), Toy Story 2 (1999), Monsters, Inc. (2001), Finding Nemo (2003), Cars (2006), Ratatouille (2007), Toy Story 3 (2010), and Brave (2012). He stated in an interview that he does not fall in love with just one sculpture he made but all of them and that for the character of Sulley he created over 30 different sculptures. He also provided the voice of the character Gamma in Up (2009) and Dug's Special Mission, Red in Cars Toons: Tales from Radiator Springs and Cars 3, the Mover in Henry Selick's Coraline, as well as Jacques in Finding Dory (2016), the sequel to Finding Nemo (2003), in which his older brother Joe voiced the same character. Before joining Pixar, Jerome served as a character sculptor for Disney's James and the Giant Peach (1996).

References

External links

Living people
Pixar people
Year of birth missing (living people)